Poppy juice may refer to:

Opium, latex of the opium poppy
Poppy tea, a water extraction of dried opium poppy seeds, fruits, or straw